Nicolas "Nico" Dewalque (born 20 September 1945, in Zichen-Zussen-Bolder) is a retired Belgian footballer.

During his career he played for R. Standard de Liège and R.F.C. de Liège. He earned 33 caps for the Belgium national football team, and participated in the 1970 FIFA World Cup.

References
Royal Belgian Football Association: Number of caps

1945 births
Living people
Footballers from Limburg (Belgium)
Belgian footballers
Belgium international footballers
1970 FIFA World Cup players
RFC Liège players
Standard Liège players
Belgian Pro League players
Association football defenders